Cai Huijue (born 1980) is a Chinese swimmer and Olympic medalist. She participated at the 1996 Summer Olympics in Atlanta, winning a bronze medal in 4 x 100 metre medley relay.

References

External links

1980 births
Living people
Chinese female butterfly swimmers
Olympic swimmers of China
Olympic bronze medalists for China
Swimmers at the 1996 Summer Olympics
Olympic bronze medalists in swimming
Medalists at the FINA World Swimming Championships (25 m)
Medalists at the 1996 Summer Olympics
20th-century Chinese women